In the theatre of ancient Greece, the eirōn "dissembler" was one of various stock characters in comedy. The  usually succeeded by bringing down his braggart opponent (the  "boaster") by understating his own abilities.

History
The  developed in Greek Old Comedy and can be found in many of Aristophanes' plays. For example, in The Frogs, after the God Dionysus claims to have sunk 12 or 13 enemy ships with Cleisthenes (son of Sibyrtius), his slave Xanthias says "Then I woke up."

Irony
Irony entails opposition (not mere difference) between the actual meaning and the apparent meaning of something.

See also
 Bômolochus
 Maieutics

References

Sources
 Abrams, M. H., ed. 1993. A Glossary of Literary Terms. 6th ed. Fort Worth: Harcourt Brace College.
 Carlson, Marvin. 1993. Theories of the Theatre: A Historical and Critical Survey from the Greeks to the Present. Expanded ed. Ithaca and London: Cornell University Press. .
 Frye, Northrop. 1957. Anatomy of Criticism: Four Essays. London: Penguin, 1990. .
 Janko, Richard, trans. 1987. Poetics with Tractatus Coislinianus, Reconstruction of Poetics II and the Fragments of the On Poets. By Aristotle. Cambridge: Hackett. .

External links
Character Functions according to Northrop Frye

Ancient Greek theatre
Male characters in theatre
Stock characters in ancient Greek comedy